The Erwadi Santhanakoodu Festival is a monthlong festival held in Ervadi dargah, located in Ramanathapuram district, to commemorate the anniversary of Sulthan Syed Ibrahim Shaheed Badhusha nayagam whose grave is in Ervadi. The festival is organised as a National Integrity festival by the local Dargah Huqdhar Management Committee (D.H.M.C.), constituting the heirs of badhusha nayagam called as Mujavirs or Levvais. It is a month-long festival happening every Hijri year in the full Islamic month of Zil Qa'dah.

It is organised to commemorate the anniversary of Sulthan Syed Ibrahim Shaheed Badhusha Oliyullah, at the famous Erwadi Dargah which always stands as a symbol of religious harmony. Every year hundreds of thousands of people from a variety of religions and communities within Tamil Nadu and elsewhere throng Erwadi on this day to witness the festival, marking the sandal anointing ceremony of the tomb.

A sense of unity in diversity is exemplified by the 'Santhanakoodu' festival with all community people's participation and contribution and going in a procession, led by a decorated elephant, dancing horse and preceded by a dancing folk arts troupe at midnight. People of all faiths, hue and colour throng the pathway leading to the dargah with reverence, once the procession reach the dargah, people of all religions enter the dargah and offer obeisance. The day is declared a holiday by the district administration and Tamil Nadu State Transport Corporation operates special buses throughout the night for the benefit of devotees.

Ervadi Santhanakoodu Festival 2019
Following is the schedule of the Grand Holy Annual Santhanakoodu (Sandanakoodu) festival commemorating the 843rd Urus festival to be held at Ervadi dargha, Ramanathapuram district for a month's time, from 4 July 2019 to 2 August 2019.

A local district holiday has been announced by the Ramanathapuram district collector and other officials of the District administration on 26 July 2019 for Erwadi Santhanakoodu (Urus) festival 2019.

Ervadi Santhanakoodu Festival 2018
Following is the schedule of the Santhanakoodu (Sandanakoodu) festival commemorating the 844th Urus festival to be held at Ervadi dargha, Ramanathapuram district for a month's time, from 14 July 2018 to 12 August 2018.

A local district holiday has been announced by the Ramanathapuram district collector and other officials of the District administration on 6 August 2018 for Erwadi Santhanakoodu (Urus) festival 2018.

References

External links
 Official website

Festivals in Tamil Nadu
Islam in India
Islamic festivals in India